"Down by the River" is a song by German folk duo Milky Chance. It was released as the second single from their debut studio album, Sadnecessary, on 28 March 2014 through Lichtdicht Records. The song has charted in France, Germany, Switzerland, and the United Kingdom. The song was written and produced by the duo themselves. The song also appears on the soundtrack for the association football video game published by EA Sports, FIFA 15.

Meaning
The meaning behind the song, as explained by Clemens in a track by track commentary, is literally about a river; the Fulda, to be exact. The song was written based on a "Experiences I (Clemens) had down by the river." He does not like to explain the story behind it because when he's writing a song, he prefers to "draw a picture" of it, so that everybody can make their own story for it.

Track listing

Chart performance

Weekly charts

Certifications

Release history

References

External links

Songs about rivers
2014 songs
2014 singles